Shawn J. Bayern is an American law professor. Before his legal career, he created several widely used computer-software systems and wrote several widely cited books on computer programming.

Biography
After graduating from Yale University, Bayern worked as a researcher at Yale University's Technology and Planning group, there developing the Central Authentication Service.

As a student, he developed a reputation for becoming critical to the university's information systems and having full access to those systems.  He was the reference-implementation lead for JSTL and sat on the specification committees that developed popular web languages including JavaServer Pages,
JAX-RPC, and JavaServer Faces.
  At the age of 23, he wrote books on JSTL and JSP  and gave award-winning speeches about Java, the Central Authentication Service, and other topics at industry conference such as Macworld Conference & Expo, Java One, and WebDevShare. He is also the creator of Time Cave, a "message-scheduling service," and he offers a free research utility for federal laws on the iPhone and iPad called "US Code."

After his computing career, Bayern went to Boalt Law at the University of California at Berkeley. There he was editor-in-chief of the California Law Review and first in his class at graduation. He then worked as a law clerk for Harris Hartz of the Tenth Circuit Court of Appeals. He has worked in the Office of the Solicitor General, on the Appellate Staff of the Civil Division of the Department of Justice, in the chambers of a United States District Judge in California, and at Covington & Burling, a Washington law firm.

Bayern is currently an assistant professor at Florida State University College of Law, and also has served as a visiting assistant professor of law at Duke Law School.

Books

JSTL in Action (Manning Press 2003).
Book Review: Java Bookshelf: Mark Cyzyk Reviews Shawn Bayern's JSTL in Action, Dr. Dobb's Journal, DDJ Java Programming E-zine, June 2003. 
Web Development with JavaServer Pages  (Manning Press 2002) (ISBN
193011012X).

Articles
 Explaining the American Norm Against Litigation, 93 California Law Review 1697 (2006).
 Minimal Backups, Sys Admin, Apr. 2001.
 Making a Wish: The Web-Interface Shell, Sys Admin, Jul. 2000.
 How to Crawl Back Inside Your Shell, Sys Admin, Nov. 1999.
 Securing Public Workstations, Windows NT Magazine, Sept. 1999.
 Automating Repetitive Tasks in NT, Windows NT Magazine, May 1998.

References

Year of birth missing (living people)
Living people
American computer programmers
Yale University alumni
UC Berkeley School of Law alumni
American legal scholars
Duke University School of Law faculty
Florida State University faculty